Tenacibaculum skagerrakense is a bacterium. It is named after Skagerrak, Denmark, where it was first isolated. Its type strain is D30T (=ATCC BAA-458T =DSM 14836T).

Description
It is Gram-negative, oxidase- and catalase-positive. Cells are rods (0.5–15 micrometres in length) during exponential growth; spherical cells occur in stationary phase. Colonies are bright yellow and flexirubin-type pigment is absent.

References

Further reading

Lawrence, John M., ed. Sea Urchins: Biology and Ecology. Vol. 38. Academic Press, 2013.
Pavlidis, Michalis, and Constantinos Mylonas, eds. Sparidae: Biology and aquaculture of gilthead sea bream and other species. Wiley. com, 2011.

External links 
WORMS entry
LPSN
Type strain of Tenacibaculum skagerrakense at BacDive -  the Bacterial Diversity Metadatabase

Flavobacteria
Bacteria described in 2004